Lucan Manor is a Georgian-Palladian house and estate in Lucan, County Dublin. A manor house, it is remembered particularly for its association with the Sarsfield family. A castle or house has been recorded on the site since at least the 12th century.

History
Lucan manor is mentioned on the pipe roll as far back as 1272 when it was granted to Norman lords on the conquest of Ireland.

The Sarsfield family first acquired Lucan when it was bought in 1566 by the Tudor era figure Sir William Sarsfield who passed it on to his younger son. The Manor remained in the hands of the Sarsfields until the Cromwellian conquest of Ireland when they were dispossessed of it due to Patrick Sarsfield's role in the Irish Rebellion of 1641.

It was then awarded to the Irish soldier Sir Theophilus Jones. After the Irish Restoration in 1660, the Sarsfields attempted to recover the estate. Despite their appeals being rejected in court, they were eventually able to secure its return following the intervention of Charles II. There were further disputes following the death of William Sarsfield in 1675, with the manor eventually passing to his daughter, Charlotte Sarsfield, who married Agmondisham Vesey.

Lucan Manor was demolished in the 1770s. Its Georgian era Palladian villa replacement, Lucan House, was constructed around 1775 by Agmondisham Vesey and today still stands on the site. Upon the death of Vesey in 1785, the house and estate passed to his son George Vesey. On his death the house passed to his daughter Elizabeth Vesey and her husband Sir Nicholas Colthurst, 4th Baronet. They and their descendants then had the house from 1836 to 1921.

Later, the house was acquired by Charles Hugh O'Conor, the son of Charles Owen O'Conor in the 1930s.

As of 2022, the house is the residence of the Italian ambassador to Ireland. The Italian government had been renting the property since 1942 and acquired the property in 1954.

References

Bibliography
 Wauchope, Piers. Patrick Sarsfield and the Williamite War. Irish Academic Press, 1992.

Buildings and structures in South Dublin (county)
Demolished buildings and structures in the Republic of Ireland
Buildings and structures demolished in the 1770s
Diplomatic residences in Dublin (city)